The Madonna della Scala is a rural church or chapel, carved within a grotto, some three kilometers south of the town of Oria in the province of Brindisi, region of Apulia, Italy.

The building was erected between 13th and 14th centuries, although it may have served to house eremitic Basilian monks as early as the 8th century. The church at one time had a Benedictine monastery attached. The romanesque style building is a simple block with a small oculus. The interior walls are stuccoed, and it is notable for frescoes in Byzantine style depicting the Old Testament and the Apocalypse.

References

Romanesque architecture in Apulia
Churches in the province of Brindisi
13th-century Roman Catholic church buildings in Italy